Nittedal is a municipality and city in Akershus in Viken county, Norway.  It is part of the traditional region of Romerike.  The administrative centre of the municipality is the village of Rotnes.

The parish of Nitedal was established as a municipality on 1 January 1838 (see formannskapsdistrikt).

Name
The name (Old Norse: Nitjudalr) is an old district name. The first element is the genitive case of the river name Nitja (now Nitelva) and the last element is dalr which means "valley" or "dale". The meaning of the river name is unknown.  Prior to 1918, the name was written "Nittedalen".

Coat-of-arms
The coat-of-arms is from modern times.  They were granted on 23 January 1987.  The arms show the two silver lines running in a bend sinister direction on a green background.  They represent the main transportation lines that run through the municipality from Oslo to other parts of the country: the main highway and the railroad, they also can represent skiing tracks, an old winter transportation method.  At the same time the two lines symbolize matches, as one of Norway's oldest match factories was founded in Nittedal. The lines also symbolize tree logs, as forestry is of great importance for the local economy.

Geography

Nittedal lies directly northeast of Oslo and serves as a suburb to the capital. It is located on both sides of the Nitelva river. The southernmost population centre is Hagan. Further north lie the centres of Slattum, Rotnes, Åneby, Grønvoll, Varingskollen, and Hakadal.

History

In 1902 the construction of the Gjøvik Line reached the west side of Nittedal, from Oslo and through the forest.

Demography

Administration
Mayor Hilde Thorkildsen is on suspension from her position.  she is still under trial for corruption.

Sister cities
The following cities are twinned with Nittedal:
  - Fredensborg, Region Hovedstaden, Denmark
  - Håbo, Uppsala County, Sweden
  - Ingå, Uusimaa, Finland

Notable people

This list includes people who were born or have resided in Nittedal:
 Peter Østbye (1855 in Nittedal - 1943) a philologist and academic administrator
 Svend Rasmussen Svendsen (1864 in Nittedal – 1945) a Norwegian American impressionist artist
 Hans Prydz (1868–1957) a physician and Mayor of Nittedal 1913/22 & 1928/34 
 Gunnar Haarstad (1916 in Nittedal – 1992) a jurist, police officer, a resistance member during World War II, and head of the Norwegian Police Security Service for fifteen years
 Tor Brustad (1926 in Nittedal – 2016) a Norwegian biophysicist
 Nils Vogt (1926 in Hakadal – 2000) a Norwegian civil servant and diplomat
 Kjell Magne Yri (born 1943) a Norwegian priest and linguist, lives in Nittedal
 Inge Solli (born 1959) a Norwegian politician, deputy county Mayor of Akershus
 Ib Thomsen (born 1961) politician
 Jarle Bernhoft (born 1976 in Nittedal) stage name Bernhoft, singer, multi-instrumentalist, composer and lyricist
 Marte Wexelsen Goksøyr (born 1982 in Nittedal) an actress, public speaker, writer and public debater with Down syndrome

Sport 
 Hroar Elvenes (1932 in Hakadal – 2014) a speed skater, competed in four Winter Olympics
 Odd Martinsen (born 1942) cross-country skier, multiple Olympic medallist, father of Bente Skari
 Terje Thorslund (born 1945) a former Norwegian champion javelin thrower
 Bente Skari (born 1972 in Nittedal) cross-country skier, multiple Olympic medallist
 Hanne Staff (born 1972 in Nittedal) an orienteering athlete
 Astrid Wanja Brune Olsen (born 1999 in Nittedal) a Norwegian tennis player

References

External links

Municipal fact sheet from Statistics Norway

Varingen: the local newspaper
Population changes from 1951 onwards

 
Municipalities of Akershus
Municipalities of Viken (county)